Humam Abd al-Khaliq Abd al-Ghafur (is an Iraqi academic and former politician, born in Ramadi, Anbar Governorate, in 1945.

Biography
He had a role in the Iraqi nuclear program. In 1981, Abdul-Khaliq was head of the Nuclear Research Center. Abdul-Razzaq Qassem al-Hashemi was appointed Minister of Higher Education and Scientific Research. Abdul-Khaliq held his previous position as Vice-President of the Iraqi Atomic Energy Organization. Nuclear research.

He was appointed Minister of Higher Education and Scientific Research in 1992, succeeding Abd al-Razzaq Qassem al-Hashemi, and then held the position of Minister of Culture and Information in 1998, succeeding Hamed Yousef Hammadi. His successor as Acting Minister of Higher Education and Scientific Research Abdul-Jabbar Tawfiq, then Minister of Education Fahd Salem Al-Shakrah as acting Minister, then Hammam Abdul-Khaleq Abdul-Ghafour returned as Minister of Higher Education and Scientific Research in 2001.

After the 2003 invasion
He was on the list of Iraqis wanted by the United States. He was arrested by the American occupation forces on April 19, 2003. It is reported that when the Americans arrested him, they threw him to the ground, then an American soldier stood with his feet above his head and neck, which caused him a permanent disability represented in the crookedness of his neck and the tilt of his head.

He was released on 18 December 2005.

References

External links

1945 births
People from Anbar (town)
Members of the Regional Command of the Arab Socialist Ba'ath Party – Iraq Region
Living people
Most-wanted Iraqi playing cards
Iraq War prisoners of war
Iraqi prisoners of war